Stubaier Bauerntheater is one of the oldest peasant theatres in the Tyrol of Austria. The theatre group was founded in 1903 in Fulpmes by Ludwig Hupfauf and Hans Klingenschmid. The former led the fate of the association as chairman for more than half a century, but was also playwright, director and, from 1961, also active as an actor. Founding member Klingenschmid died in 1934. The theatre, based in the parish hall on the Torquato-Tasso-Straße in Fulpmes, Austria, as of 2012 had 10 members.

The theatre puts on a wide range of plays including dramas and comedies, and has evolved from originally performing plays with rural themes to more modern plays. In 2021 the Stubaier Bauerntheater put on a performance of Max Neal's The Sinful Village.

Chairmen 
 1903–1953 - Ludwig Hupfauf 
 1953–1983 - Hans Bichler
 1983–2007 - Herbert Mair
 2007– - Michael Pfurtscheller

References

External links
Website

Theatres in Austria